The Regulators may refer to:

 The Regulators (novel), a novel written by Stephen King under the pseudonym 'Richard Bachman'. Known as the sister book to King's novel Desperation
 The Lincoln County Regulators, a posse led by notorious Old West outlaw, Billy the Kid, in the 1870s
The Regulators of the Regulator Insurrection in North Carolina, 1766-1771